Charles Gocher Jr. (November 12, 1952 – February 19, 2007) was an American musician, writer and visual artist, most famous for being a founding member, lyricist and drummer of the experimental rock group Sun City Girls. He also released Pint Sized Spartacus, a solo album under his own name, in 1997. Charles lost his long battle with cancer on February 19, 2007, in Seattle, aged 54. The two other members of Sun City Girls, brothers Alan and Richard Bishop, embarked on a tour of the United States and Canada called "The Brothers Unconnected" in tribute to Charles' death, featuring showings of the man's video works and stripped-down, acoustic versions of selected Sun City Girls songs, including several tracks written by Gocher himself.

External links 
 Invisible Tempos of the Vanishing Assassin by Alan Bishop
 A tribute page to Charles Gocher
 An announcement of Gocher's death on WFMU's Beware of the Blog

1952 births
2007 deaths
American rock drummers
Musicians from Arizona
Sun City Girls members
20th-century American drummers
American male drummers
20th-century American male musicians